Holiday in St. Tropez is a 1964 West German comedy film directed by Ernst Hofbauer and starring Vivi Bach, Ann Smyrner, and Rudolf Prack.

Cast

References

Bibliography

External links 
 

1964 films
1964 musical comedy films
German musical comedy films
West German films
1960s German-language films
Films directed by Ernst Hofbauer
Constantin Film films
Films about vacationing
Films set in hotels
Films set in the Mediterranean Sea
Films shot in Croatia
Films shot in Yugoslavia
1960s German films